Guildford Borough Council in Surrey, England is elected every four years.

Political control
In 1974, Guildford Borough Council replaced the two previous councils for the area - Guildford Municipal Borough Council (the town council) and Guildford Rural District Council (the council serving the surrounding rural area). The first elections for the new Guildford Borough Council were held on 7 June 1973, initially operating as a shadow authority prior to the new council coming into effect on 1 April 1974.

Guildford Municipal Borough Council

Guildford Borough Council

Leadership
The leaders of the council since 2010 have been:

Council elections

1973

Number of councillors per ward is shown in brackets after the ward name.

Wards won by the Conservatives – Artington, Compton, Puttenham, Seale and Tongham, Shackleford and Wanborough (2); Ash (5); Effingham (1); Merrow and Burpham (5); Normandy (1); Onslow (3); Pirbright (1); Ripley, Wisley and Ockham (1); Send (2); Shalford (1); Stoughton (2); Worplesdon (2)

Wards won by Labour – Stoke (3); Westborough (3)

Ward won by the Liberals – Friary and St Nicolas (3)

Ward won by Independents – Aldbury, Shere and St Martha's (2)

Wards electing councillors of more than one party – East Clandon, West Clandon, East Horsley and West Horsley (3 – 2 Con; 1 Lib); Holy Trinity (2 – 1 Con, 1 Lib)

This was the first election of councillors for the new Guildford Borough Council formed as a successor to the Guildford Municipal Borough Council (the town council) and the Guildford Rural District Council.

There was a partial redrawing of ward boundaries and alteration of numbers of councillors elected per ward in the run up to the 1973 elections in Guildford.  One example was Friary and St Nicolas which had been separate wards in the old Guildford Municipal Borough Council in 1972 but which were merged to form a new joint Friary and St Nicolas ward in time for these 1973 elections.  A further redrawing of Guildford ward boundaries would occur in time for the next full council election in 1976.

1976

Number of councillors per ward is shown in brackets after the ward name.

Wards won by the Conservatives – Ash (3); Ash Vale (2); Christchurch (2); Clandon and Horsley (3); Effingham (1); Lovelace (1); Merrow and Burpham (3); Normandy (1); Pilgrims (2); Pirbright (1); Onslow (3); Send (2); Shalford (1); Stoughton (3); Worplesdon (3)

Wards won by Labour – Stoke (3); Westborough (3)

Ward won by Independent Conservative – Tongham (1)

Wards electing councillors of more than one party – Friary and St Nicolas (3 – 2 Con, 1 Lib); Holy Trinity (2 – 1 Con, 1 Lib); Tillingbourne (2 – 1 Con, 1 Ind)

Guildford ward boundaries were redrawn in time for the 1976 council elections. Changes included:

•  Ash ward was split into two wards Ash plus Ash Vale;

•  a new ward, Christchurch, was created from part of Stoke ward and part of Merrow and Burpham ward;

•  Artington, Compton, Puttenham, Seale and Tongham, Shackleford and Wanborough ward was split into two wards Tongham plus Pilgrims;

•  Aldbury, Shere and St Martha's ward was renamed Tillingbourne;

•  East Clandon, West Clandon, East Horsley and West Horsley ward was renamed Clandon and Horsley; and

•  Ripley, Wisley and Ockham ward was renamed Lovelace.

Both Pirbright and Lovelace wards had only one candidate who stood at the 1976 council elections.  The respective candidate standing in each of these two wards was thus returned without the need for a vote.

1979

Number of councillors per ward is shown in brackets after the ward name.

Wards won by the Conservatives – Ash (3); Ash Vale (2); Christchurch (2); Clandon and Horsley (3); Effingham (1); Holy Trinity (2); Merrow and Burpham (3); Normandy (1); Pilgrims (2); Pirbright (1); Onslow (3); Send (2); Shalford (1); Tongham (1); Worplesdon (3)

Wards won by Labour – Stoke (3); Westborough (3)

Ward won by Independent – Lovelace (1)

Wards electing councillors of more than one party – Friary and St Nicolas (3 – 2 Con, 1 Lib); Stoughton (3 – 1 Con, 2 Lib); Tillingbourne (2 – 1 Con, 1 Ind)

These 1979 council elections coincided with the general election resulting in a turnout of 74.8%.  This contrasts with the turnout of 40–50% which occurred in every other full Guildford Borough Council election between 1973 and 1995.

Send ward had only two candidates for the two council positions up for election in 1979.  These two candidates were consequently returned without the need for a vote.  This is the last time, to date (2015), that any ward in a full Guildford Borough Council election has returned councillors unopposed.

In 1979 Labour finished second in number of councillors and in percentage vote.  In Guildford Borough Council elections following the 1979 one, Labour has, to date (2015), never again finished in the top two in either number of councillors or percentage vote.

1983

Number of councillors per ward is shown in brackets after the ward name.

Wards won by the Conservatives – Ash (3); Ash Vale (2); Christchurch (2); Clandon and Horsley (3); Effingham (1); Lovelace (1); Holy Trinity (2); Merrow and Burpham (3); Normandy (1); Pilgrims (2); Pirbright (1); Send (2); Shalford (1); Tongham (1); Worplesdon (3)

Wards won by Labour – Stoke (3); Westborough (3)

Ward won by SDP-Liberal Alliance – Friary and St Nicolas (3)

Wards electing councillors of more than one party – Onslow (3 – 1 Con, 2 Alliance); Stoughton (3 – 1 Con, 2 Alliance); Tillingbourne (2 – 1 Con, 1 Ind)

The SDP was formed in 1981.  The 1983 elections were the first full Guildford Borough Council elections fought by the new SDP-Liberal Alliance.

The 1983 elections saw every ward in Guildford contested by at least one Conservative candidate and at least one Labour candidate.  The SDP-Liberal Alliance contested every ward in Guildford bar two Normandy and Tongham.

1987

Number of councillors per ward is shown in brackets after the ward name.

Wards won by the Conservatives – Ash (3); Ash Vale (2); Christchurch (2); Clandon and Horsley (3); Effingham (1); Lovelace (1); Holy Trinity (2); Merrow and Burpham (3); Pilgrims (2); Pirbright (1); Send (2); Shalford (1); Tillingbourne (2); Tongham (1); Worplesdon (3)

Wards won by Labour – Stoke (3); Westborough (3)

Wards won by SDP-Liberal Alliance – Friary and St Nicolas (3); Normandy (1); Stoughton (3)

Ward electing councillors of more than one party – Onslow (3 – 1 Con, 2 Alliance)

In 1987, the Conservatives won their fifth successive Guildford Borough Council election.

1987 marked the low point for independents contesting Guildford Borough Council elections. There was only one independent candidate in any ward in Guildford.  He stood in Worplesdon and finished in seventh place out of the ten candidates up for election in that ward; the top three getting elected.

Conservatives contested every ward in Guildford in this election.  Labour contested every ward bar Shalford and the SDP-Liberal Alliance contested every ward except Tillingbourne.

Borough boundary changes took place but the number of seats remained the same.

1991

Number of councillors per ward is shown in brackets after the ward name.

Wards won by the Conservatives – Clandon and Horsley (3); Effingham (1); Lovelace (1); Merrow and Burpham (3); Pilgrims (2); Pirbright (1); Send (2); Shalford (1); Worplesdon (3)

Wards won by Labour – Stoke (3); Westborough (3)

Wards won by Liberal Democrats – Ash (3); Ash Vale (2); Friary and St Nicolas (3); Holy Trinity (2); Normandy (1); Onslow (3); Stoughton (3); Tongham (1)

Wards electing councillors of more than one party – Christchurch (2 – 1 Con, 1 LibD); Tillingbourne (2 – 1 Con, 1 Ind)

Between the 1987 and 1991 council elections the Liberals and SDP had merged.  The new party was initially called the Social and Liberal Democrat Party, but was renamed the Liberal Democrat Party in the second half of 1989.

The 1991 council elections saw the Conservatives lose control of Guildford Borough Council for the first time since it was created in the early 1970s.  Conservatives and Liberal Democrats ended up tied on 19 councillors each.

Each ward was contested by at least one Conservative and one Liberal Democrat candidate.  Labour contested every ward bar two Lovelace and Pirbright.  Ten wards, the eight town wards plus Shalford and Worplesdon, were contested by "All Night" candidates.

An independent was returned to the council representing Tillingbourne.  At every full council election between 1973 and 2003, except 1987, Tillingbourne (and its predecessor Aldbury, Shere and St Martha's) returned at least one independent councillor.  In 1987 no independent candidate had contested the election in Tillingbourne.

1995

Number of councillors per ward is shown in brackets after the ward name.

Wards won by the Conservatives – Clandon and Horsley (3); Effingham (1); Lovelace (1); Pilgrims (2); Pirbright (1); Send (2); Shalford (1)

Wards won by Labour – Stoke (3); Westborough (3)

Wards won by Liberal Democrats – Friary and St Nicolas (3); Holy Trinity (2); Merrow and Burpham (3); Normandy (1); Onslow (3); Stoughton (3); Tongham (1); Worplesdon (3)

Ward won by Putting Ash Vale First – Ash Vale (2)

Wards electing councillors of more than one party – Ash (3 – 1 Con, 2 LibD); Christchurch (2 – 1 Con, 1 LibD); Tillingbourne (2 – 1 LibD, 1 Ind)

To date (2015), 1995 was the Conservatives worst ever electoral performance on Guildford Borough Council and the Liberal Democrats best.  The Liberal Democrats won control of the council with a majority of 1.

In Ash Vale, a councillor who had been elected in 1991 as a Liberal Democrat, but had subsequently resigned from the party, stood and was elected along with another candidate under the banner "Putting Ash Vale First".

Borough boundary changes took place but the number of seats remained the same.

1999

Number of councillors per ward is shown in brackets after the ward name.

Wards won by the Conservatives – Ash (3); Ash Vale (2); Clandon and Horsley (3); Effingham (1); Lovelace (1); Normandy (1); Pilgrims (2); Pirbright (1); Send (2); Shalford (1)

Wards won by Labour – Stoke (3); Westborough (3)

Wards won by Liberal Democrats – Friary and St Nicolas (3); Holy Trinity (2); Merrow and Burpham (3); Onslow (3); Stoughton (3); Worplesdon (3)

Ward won by independent –  Tongham (1)

Wards electing councillors of more than one party – Christchurch (2 – 1 Con, 1 LibD); Tillingbourne (2 – 1 LibD, 1 Ind)

In 1999, for the first time the percentage turnout in a full Guildford Borough Council election fell below 40% as only 36.2% of people voted.

1999 was the first election for Guildford Borough Council in which all three main political parties Conservatives, Labour and Liberal Democrats each contested every ward.

The Liberal Democrats had lost majority control of Guildford Borough Council in February 1997 as a result of councillors resigning from the party. Following the 1999 election the council remained no overall control with the Liberal Democrats as the largest group on the council.

2003

Number of councillors per ward is shown in brackets after the ward name.

Wards won by the Conservatives – Ash South & Tongham (3); Ash Vale (2); Ash Wharf (2); Clandon & Horsley (3); Lovelace (1); Merrow (3); Normandy (1); Pilgrims (1); Pirbright (1); Send (2); Shalford (2)

Ward won by Labour – Stoke (2)

Wards won by Liberal Democrats – Effingham (1); Friary and St Nicolas (3); Stoughton (3); Westborough (3); Worplesdon (3)

Wards electing councillors of more than one party – Burpham (2 – 1 Con, 1 LibD); Christchurch (2 – 1 Con, 1 LibD); Holy Trinity (3 – 1 Con, 2 LibD); Onslow (3 – 1 Con, 2 LibD); Tillingbourne (2 – 1 Con, 1 Ind)

The 2003 elections were conducted by an all postal ballot.  Turnout at 53.4% for the full council elections was above 50% for only the second time in Guildford Borough Council history, the other occasion being in 1979 when the elections were held on the same day as the general election.

Between 1976 and 1999 Guildford Borough Council had been divided into 21 wards with a total of 45 councillors.  Rewarding, prior to the 2003 elections, saw the council divided into 22 wards with a total of 48 councillors. Merrow and Burpham ward was divided into two wards Merrow ward and Burpham ward.

For only the second time all three main parties Conservatives, Labour and Liberal Democrats each contested every ward in a full Guildford Borough Council election.

The Conservatives won control of the council with a majority of four.

Labour lost Westborough ward thus ending a period of continuous Labour representation for this ward since 1934.

2007

Number of councillors per ward is shown in brackets after the ward name.

Wards won by the Conservatives – Ash South & Tongham (3); Ash Vale (2); Ash Wharf (2); Christchurch (2); Clandon & Horsley (3); Lovelace (1); Merrow (3); Normandy (1); Pilgrims (1); Pirbright (1); Send (2); Shalford (2); Tillingbourne (2)

Wards won by Liberal Democrats – Burpham (2); Effingham (1); Friary and St Nicolas (3); Onslow (3); Stoke (2); Stoughton (3); Westborough (3); Worplesdon (3)

Wards electing councillors of more than one party – Holy Trinity (3 – 1 Con, 2 LibD)

The Conservatives retained control of the council in the 2007 elections with a majority of four over the Liberal Democrats; these being the only two groups with elected councillors in 2007.  Labour lost their last two councillors.  No independents were elected.

Conservative and Liberal Democrat candidates contested every ward in Guildford.  Labour did not contest seven wards Ash South & Tongham; Ash Vale; Ash Wharf; Effingham; Normandy; Pilgrims; and Pirbright.

2011

Number of councillors per ward is shown in brackets after the ward name.

Wards won by the Conservatives – Ash South & Tongham (3); Ash Vale (2); Ash Wharf (2); Burpham (2); Christchurch (2); Clandon & Horsley (3); Lovelace (1); Holy Trinity (3); Merrow (3); Normandy (1); Pilgrims (1); Pirbright (1); Send (2); Shalford (2); Tillingbourne (2); Worplesdon (3)

Wards won by Liberal Democrats – Effingham (1); Friary and St Nicolas (3); Stoughton (3)

Wards electing councillors of more than one party – Onslow (3 – 1 Con, 2 LibD); Stoke (2 – 1Lab, 1LibD); Westborough (3 – 1Lab, 2LibD)

The Conservatives retained control of Guildford council with an increased majority of 20 seats.  Labour returned to the council, after a four-year absence, with 2 seats.

Only the Conservatives contested every ward in Guildford, in 2011.  The Liberal Democrats did not contest Ash South & Tongham or Ash Vale.  Labour did not contest Ash Vale or Pirbright.   A total of 9 candidates from the Peace Party contested wards in the west part of Guildford town.  5 wards were contested by UKIP candidates.  1 ward, Onslow, was contested by the Green Party.  There was also one independent candidate, who stood in Normandy.

2015

Number of councillors per ward is shown in brackets after the ward name.

Wards won by the Conservatives – Ash South & Tongham (3); Ash Vale (2); Ash Wharf (2); Burpham (2); Christchurch (2); Holy Trinity (3); Merrow (3); Normandy (1); Pilgrims (1); Pirbright (1); Shalford (2); Tillingbourne (2); Worplesdon (3)

Wards won by Liberal Democrats – Effingham (1); Lovelace (1)

Wards won by Guildford Greenbelt Group - Send (2)

Wards electing councillors of more than one party – Clandon & Horsley (3 –  2 Con, 1 Guildford Greenbelt); Friary and St Nicolas (3 – 1 Con, 2 LibD); Onslow (3 – 1 Con, 2 LibD); Stoke (2 – 1 Con, 1 Lab); Stoughton (3 – 1 Con, 2 LibD), Westborough (3 – 2 Con, 1 LibD)

The 2015 council elections coincided with the United Kingdom general election.

The results saw the Conservatives retain control of Guildford Borough Council, narrowly increasing their majority.

The Guildford Greenbelt Group won 3 seats on the council, all in rural wards towards the north east and east of the borough.

The Conservatives gained a seat on Stoke ward and 2 seats on Westborough ward, the first time they had won seats on either of these wards since the creation of Guildford Borough Council in the early 1970s.

The Conservatives and the Liberal Democrats were the only parties which contested all the wards in Guildford in the 2015 local elections.

2019

Number of councillors per ward is shown in brackets after the ward name.

Wards won solely by the Liberal Democrats – Burpham (2); Friary & St Nicolas (3); Effingham (1); Onslow (3); Stoughton (3); Westborough (3)

Wards won solely by Residents for Guildford and Villages (R4GV) – Christchurch (2); Holy Trinity (3); Lovelace (1); Pilgrims (1); Worplesdon (3)

Wards won solely by the Conservatives – Ash Vale (2); Ash Wharf (2); Pirbright (1); Normandy (1)

Wards won solely by Guildford Greenbelt Group – Send (2)

Wards won solely by Labour – Stoke (2)

Wards electing councillors of more than one party – Ash South & Tongham (3 – 2 Con, 1 R4GV); Clandon & Horsley (3 – 2 R4GV, 1 Guildford Greenbelt); Merrow (3 - 1 R4GV, 2 Lib Dem); Shalford (2 - 1 R4GV, 1 Guildford Greenbelt), Tillingbourne (2 - 1 Con, 1 Green)

The results saw the Conservatives lose control of Guildford Borough Council, falling from 31 seats to 9, making the Liberal Democrats the largest party on 17 seats.

Prior to the election, 3 councillors had defected from the Conservatives and 1 had defected from the Liberal Democrats to form the Independent Alliance on the council. The Independent Alliance registered Residents for Guildford and Villages as a political party to contest the 2019 elections and proceeded to win 15 seats.

The Guildford Greenbelt Group increased their representation to 4 seats whilst Labour maintained a by-election gain from the Conservatives to emerge with 2 seats.

The Green party also won their first seat on Guildford Borough Council in Tillingbourne ward. Following the election the Green councillor chose to sit on the council as part of the R4GV group.

After taking office, on 15 May 2019 councillors voted by 23 to 19 to elect the Liberal Democrat group leader, Caroline Reeves, as Leader of Guildford Borough Council over the leader of the R4GV group, Joss Bigmore. On 20 May 2019 Caroline Reeves announced that (including herself) the council's Cabinet would consist of 8 Liberal Democrats, 1 R4GV and 1 GGG councillor with an additional R4GV councillor attending cabinet as a non-voting deputy. This was the first Liberal Democrat-led administration of Guildford Borough Council since 2003. In October 2020, Caroline Reeves handed the leadership to the R4GV party leader, Joss Bigmore, as part of a power sharing agreement. This was the first independent-led administration in Guildford Borough Council's history. Lib Dem group leader Julia McShane regained the council leadership back in October 2022, giving each party 2 years in control.

By-election results

1995–1999

1999–2003

2003–2007

2007–2011

2011–2015

2015–2019

2019–2023

Surrey County Council electoral divisions in Guildford
Guildford is located in the county of Surrey.  The number of seats (or electoral divisions) on Surrey County Council was increased from 76 to 80, in time for the 2005 election.  This resulted in an increase of one in the number of those seats located in the borough of Guildford; from 9 to 10 seats.  A summary of the number of seats won by each political party, within the borough of Guildford, is shown below for the County Council elections from 1965 onwards.

Seats changing hands in 1965
The Conservatives gained the electoral division of Guildford East from an Independent.  Labour gained the electoral divisions of Guildford North and Guildford West from the Conservatives.

The Conservatives won Ash, Guildford East, Guildford South, Horsleys, Shalford, Shere and Worplesdon.  Labour won Guildford North and Guildford West.

Seats changing hands in 1967
The Conservatives gained the electoral divisions of Guildford North and Guildford West from Labour.

The Conservatives consequently won all nine of the electoral divisions in Guildford namely Ash, Guildford East, Guildford North, Guildford South, Guildford West, Horsleys, Shalford, Shere and Worplesdon.

Seats changing hands in 1970
Labour gained the electoral division of Guildford West from the Conservatives.

The Conservatives won Ash, Guildford East, Guildford North, Guildford South, Horsleys, Shalford, Shere and Worplesdon.  Labour won Guildford West.

Seats changing hands in 1973
Labour gained the electoral division of Guildford North from the Conservatives.  The Liberals gained the electoral division of Guildford South from the Conservatives.

The Conservatives won Ash, Guildford East, Horsleys, Shalford, Shere and Worplesdon.  Labour won Guildford North and Guildford West.  The Liberals won Guildford South.

Seats changing hands in 1977
The Conservatives gained the electoral divisions of Guildford North and Guildford West from Labour, and gained the electoral division of Guildford South from the Liberals.

The Conservatives consequently won all nine of the electoral divisions in Guildford namely Ash, Guildford East, Guildford North, Guildford South, Guildford West, Horsleys, Shalford, Shere and Worplesdon.

Seats changing hands in 1981
Labour gained the electoral divisions of Guildford North and Guildford West from the Conservatives.

The Conservatives won Ash, Guildford East, Guildford South, Horsleys, Shalford, Shere and Worplesdon.  Labour won Guildford North and Guildford West.

Seats changing hands in 1985
The SDP-Liberal Alliance gained the electoral division of Guildford South from the Conservatives.  The SDP-Liberal Alliance retained the electoral division of Worplesdon which they had gained from the Conservatives in a by-election, in November 1984.

The Conservatives won Ash, Guildford East, Horsleys, Shalford and Shere.  The SDP-Liberal Alliance won Guildford South and Worplesdon.  Labour won Guildford North and Guildford West.

Seats changing hands in 1989
The Conservatives gained the electoral division of Worplesdon from the Social and Liberal Democrats.

The Conservatives won Ash, Guildford East, Horsleys, Shalford, Shere and Worplesdon.  The Social and Liberal Democrats won Guildford South.  Labour won Guildford North and Guildford West.

Seats changing hands in 1993
The Liberal Democrats gained the electoral division of Guildford North from Labour and the electoral division of Worplesdon from the Conservatives.  The Liberal Democrats retained the electoral division of Ash which they had gained from the Conservatives in a by-election, in 1990.

The Conservatives won Guildford East, Horsleys, Shalford, and Shere.  The Liberal Democrats won Ash, Guildford North, Guildford South and Worplesdon.  Labour won Guildford West.

Seats changing hands in 1997
The Conservatives gained the electoral division of Ash from the Liberal Democrats.

The Conservatives won Ash, Guildford East, Horsleys, Shalford, and Shere.  The Liberal Democrats won Guildford North, Guildford South and Worplesdon.  Labour won Guildford West.

Seats changing hands in 2001
None – all seats were retained by the party which held that seat going into the election.

The Conservatives retained Ash, Guildford East, Horsleys, Shalford, and Shere.  The Liberal Democrats retained Guildford North, Guildford South and Worplesdon.  Labour retained Guildford West.

Seats changing hands in 2005
The Liberal Democrats gained the electoral division of Guildford West from Labour and the electoral division Guildford East from the Conservatives.  The Conservatives gained the electoral division of Worplesdon from the Liberal Democrats.

In the 2005 election, the number of County Council electoral divisions in the borough of Guildford was increased from 9 to 10.  This saw the disappearance of the division known as Guildford South and the creation of two new electoral divisions known as Guildford South East and Guildford South West.  The Liberal Democrats, who prior to this election had held the old division of Guildford South, won both of the new divisions Guildford South East and Guildford South West.

The Conservatives won Ash, Horsleys, Shalford, Shere and Worplesdon.  The Liberal Democrats won Guildford East, Guildford North, Guildford South East, Guildford South West and Guildford West.

Seats changing hands in 2009
The Conservatives gained two electoral divisions, Guildford East and Guildford South East, from the Liberal Democrats.

The Conservatives won Ash, Guildford East, Guildford South East, Horsleys, Shalford, Shere and Worplesdon.  The Liberal Democrats won Guildford North, Guildford South West and Guildford West.

Seats changing hands in 2013
The Conservatives did not contest the electoral division of Shalford as they failed to submit candidate nomination papers by the deadline. The United Kingdom Independence Party gained the electoral division of Shalford from the Conservatives.

The Conservatives retained Ash, Guildford East, Guildford South East, Horsleys, Shere and Worplesdon.  The Liberal Democrats retained Guildford North, Guildford South West and Guildford West.  UKIP won Shalford.

Seats changing hands in 2017
The Conservatives regained the electoral division of Shalford from the United Kingdom Independence Party.  No other seats changed hands in the Guildford area in the 2017 Surrey County Council elections.

The Conservatives retained Ash, Guildford East, Guildford South East, Horsleys, Shere and Worplesdon; and they gained Shalford.  The Liberal Democrats retained Guildford North, Guildford South West and Guildford West.

Seats changing hands in 2021
In the 2021 Surrey County Council election the Liberal Democrats gained the electoral divisions of Ash and Guildford East from the Conservatives who also lost the electoral divisions of Guildford South East and Horsleys to Residents for Guildford and Villages (R4GV). The election saw an agreement between the Green Party and the Liberal Democrats where they did not stand against each other, resulting in the Green Party standing a candidate in the Shere division only, while the Liberal Democrats contested only the other nine divisions within Guildford borough.

The Conservatives Shalford, Shere and Worplesdon. The Liberal Democrats retained Guildford North, Guildford South West and Guildford West; they gained Ash and Guildford East. R4GV, standing in the county council elections for the first time, gained Guildford South East and Horsleys.

References

 Guildford election results
 By-election results

External links
Guildford Council

 
Politics of Guildford
Council elections in Surrey
District council elections in England